Margaret II Audley (died 1373) was a co-heiress to the feudal barony of Barnstaple in Devon, England.

Origins
Margaret was a daughter of James Audley, 2nd Baron Audley (1312/13–1386), seated at the manor of Tawstock, feudal baron of Barnstaple, by his second wife Isabel LeStrange, daughter of Roger le Strange, 5th Baron Strange (c. 1327–1382) of Knokyn. In 1370 James Audley settled the manor of Tawstock in tail male successively to his three sons from his second marriage, thus Margaret's brothers, Thomas, Rodeland and James, who all died childless. On the death of James Audley in 1386 the barony of Barnstaple, including two thirds of the manor of Tawstock, passed to his surviving son (from his first marriage) Nicholas Audley, 3rd Baron Audley (c.1328–1391), who died childless. Nicholas's co-heiresses were his two full-sisters Joan and Margaret I and his half-sister Margaret II, who inherited Tawstock:
Joan Audley (1331–1393) who married Sir John Tuchet (1327–1371),
Margaret I Audley (pre-1351–1410/11), who married Sir Roger Hillary,
Margaret II Audley, his half-sister, who, according to William Pole, inherited Tawstock by a special entail, wife of Fulk VIII FitzWarin, 4th Baron FitzWarin (1341–1374)

Inheritance
The lands which descended via Lady Margaret Audley to the FitzWarins and Bourchiers included:
Tawstock
Nymet Tracy, 
St Marychurch, 
Kingston,
Marwood, 
Upexe
Creedy Wiger, near Crediton

Marriage and children

Margaret II Audley married Fulk VIII FitzWarin, 4th Baron FitzWarin (1341–1374). The FitzWarin family were powerful Marcher Lords seated at Whittington Castle in Shropshire and at Alveston in Gloucestershire. The title Baron FitzWarin was created by writ of summons for Fulk V FitzWarin in 1295. (For the descendants of Margaret Audley see Manor of Tawstock.)

Death and burial
Margaret died in 1373 and it is believed that she is represented by the oak effigy of a recumbent lady formerly in a niche in the north wall of St Peter's Church, Tawstock, from where it was removed to the Museum of Barnstaple and North Devon in Barnstaple.

Sources
Lauder, Rosemary, Devon Families, Tiverton, 2002, pp. 151–156, Wrey of Tawstock, p. 152
Sanders, I.J., English Baronies, Oxford, 1960, p. 104, Barony of Barnstaple
Vivian, Lt.Col. J.L., (Ed.) The Visitations of the County of Devon: Comprising the Heralds' Visitations of 1531, 1564 & 1620, Exeter, 1895, p. 552, pedigree of Martyn, Barons of Barnstaple

References

People from Barnstaple
1373 deaths
14th-century births